Liam John Spence (born 9 April 1998) is an Australian professional baseball infielder for the Chicago Cubs organization.

Career
Spence graduated from St. Joseph's College in Geelong, Victoria. He then attended Central Arizona College, where he played college baseball for two years, before he transferred to the University of Tennessee to play for the Tennessee Volunteers. In 2021, he was a finalist for the Brooks Wallace Award.

The Chicago Cubs selected Spence in the fifth round of the 2021 MLB draft. He played for the South Bend Cubs after he signed in 2021 and for the Myrtle Beach Pelicans during the 2022 season. Spence is a member of the Australia national baseball team in the 2023 World Baseball Classic.

Personal life
Liam's two older brothers, Josh and Nic, played baseball for Central Arizona. Josh also played for the San Diego Padres of Major League Baseball.

References

External links

Living people
1998 births
Sportspeople from Geelong
Australian baseball players
Central Arizona Vaqueros baseball players
Tennessee Volunteers baseball players
South Bend Cubs players
Myrtle Beach Pelicans players
2023 World Baseball Classic players